Tina Campbell (born 1971) is a Northern Irish television presenter and journalist. She parted company with UTV in early 2013 and is currently a newscaster on BBC Radio Ulster and BBC Newsline.

Broadcasting career
Born in Dundonald, Tina Campbell was a reporter and newsreader for Downtown Radio. She also worked at BBC Radio Ulster as a Traffic and Travel presenter.

Tina Campbell joined UTV as a continuity announcer in 1994 before moving to the newsroom in 1997.  She hosted the 1997 and 1998 series of What Next? and contributed to a UTV documentary on the Ulster Hospital in 2007. She was also one of the original presenters for UTV Life and a relief weather presenter for Frank Mitchell.

Campbell was appointed as the second female anchor of UTV Live in February 2007, replacing Kate Smith.  In 2008, she presented two series of UTV's topical debate show Late and Live. and also hosted The Seven Thirty Show on UTV.
She is currently employed by BBC Northern Ireland as a Radio Newsreader on BBC Radio Ulster and a TV Newsreader and Continuity Announcer.

Personal life
Campbell attended Strathearn Grammar School and Bangor Girls' High School and went on to study English at Queen's University, Belfast, and journalism.

She is married to John Paul Ballantine, with whom she has three children, Charlotte, Sophie and Ben. She lives in Cloughey, County Down.

She has a brother Gav Campbell, who is the lead singer and guitarist from the band Phoenix23.

References

1971 births
Living people
ITV Weather
Television presenters from Northern Ireland
Journalists from Northern Ireland
People from Dundonald, County Down
Radio and television announcers
UTV (TV channel)
People educated at Strathearn School